Cosmopterix complicata is a moth of the family Cosmopterigidae. It is known from Thailand.

References

complicata